The Kuching Old Courthouse is a historical courthouse in Kuching, Sarawak, Malaysia.

History

After Charles Brooke was proclaimed as the Rajah of Sarawak in 1868, he was looking for a better venue for the administrative center of the government of Sarawak. The construction of the courthouse building started in 1868 and completed in 1874, which was then officiated by William Henry Rodway. In 1883, a clock tower was added to the building at the entrance area. In 1924, the memorial for Charles Brooke was constructed at the building entrance square. It was used as the administrative center for the government of Sarawak until 1973. In 2003, the building was converted into the Sarawak Tourism Complex.

Architecture
The building consists of 4 blocks. It is covered with iron wood roof. It is equipped with various facilities, such as restaurant etc.

See also
 List of tourist attractions in Malaysia

References

Buildings and structures in Kuching
1874 establishments in Sarawak
19th-century architecture in Malaysia